KCS may refer to:

Schools
 Kanawha County Schools, West Virginia
 Kennet School, a state school in south east England
 Kihei Charter School, in Kihei, Maui, Hawaii
 King's College School, an independent day school in south west London, England
 King's College School, a day school in Madrid, Spain operated by King's Group
 Kingsford Community School, an east London secondary school

Science and technology
 Keratoconjunctivitis sicca
 Killed carbon steel
 kilocycles per second, another name for kilohertz
 Kansas City standard, a standard for encoding binary data on tape used by many early microcomputers
 Knowledge-centered support, a service delivery method
 Keyboard Controller Style, an interface often used in the Intelligent Platform Management Interface architecture
 Korean Chemical Society
 Very-long-chain 3-oxoacyl-CoA synthase, an enzyme

Other
 Czechoslovak koruna, a unit of currency abbreviated Kcs
 Clinical Centre of Serbia, a medical center in Serbia, third largest in the world
 Kansas City Southern Railway, an American railroad
Kansas City Southern (company), its parent company
 KCSF, formerly KCS radio station
 King's Colour Squadron, the unit of the RAF that safeguard's the King's Colour.